The Gyeongbu high-speed railway, also known as Gyeongbu HSR, is South Korea's first high-speed rail line from Seoul to Busan. KTX high-speed trains operate three sections of the line: on April 1, 2004, the first between a junction near Geumcheon-gu Office station, Seoul and a junction at Daejeonjochajang station north of Daejeon, and a second between a junction at Okcheon station, southeast of Daejeon, and a junction near Jicheon station, north of Daegu entered service; then on November 1, 2010, the third section, between a junction west of Daegu and Busan became operational. The missing gaps across the urban areas of Daejeon and Daegu were in construction for an expected opening in 2014, separate tracks into Seoul Station were also planned. The temporary ends of the three sections were connected to the parallel conventional Gyeongbu Line by tracks that will serve as interconnector branches upon the completion of the entire line. On August 1, 2015, construction on urban areas of Daejeon and Daegu were completed; all the sections of HSR line were connected.

As of November 2010, two train services use the line: the Gyeongbu KTX Line, with trains running along the Gyeongbu HSR or the parallel Gyeongbu Line only; and the Honam KTX Line, with trains leaving the Gyeongbu HSR at Daejeon and continuing on the conventional Honam Line. A number of other high-speed lines branching from the Gyeongbu HSR are in construction or planned, and several more KTX services using connecting conventional rail lines are also planned. After 2016, the privately owned SRT service started operations on the railway from Suseo station in Seoul.

History

Origins
The Seoul-Busan axis is Korea's main traffic corridor. In 1995, it housed 73.3% of Korea's population, and conducted 70% of the freight traffic and 66% of the passenger traffic. With both the Gyeongbu Expressway and Korail's Gyeongbu Line congested, the government saw the need of another mode of transport.

The first proposals for a second Seoul-Busan railway line originated from a study prepared between 1972 and 1974 by experts of France's SNCF and Japan Railway Technical Service on a request from the IBRD.  A more detailed 1978-1981 study by KAIST, focusing on the needs of freight transport, also came to the conclusion that separating off long-distance passenger traffic on a high-speed passenger railway would be advisable, thus it was taken up in Korea's next Five Year Plan.

During the next years, several feasibility studies were prepared for a high-speed line with a Seoul–Busan travel time of 1 hour 30 minutes, which gave positive results.  In 1989, following the go-ahead for the project, the institutions to manage its preparation were established: the Gyeongbu High Speed Electric Railway & New International Airport Committee, and the High Speed Electric Railway Planning Department (later renamed HSR Project Planning Board).  In 1990, the foreseen Seoul-Busan travel time was 1 hour 51 minutes, the project was to be implemented by August 1998, and costs were estimated at 5,846.2 billion South Korean won in 1988 prices, of which 4.8 trillion won was foreseen for the high-speed line itself, and the remainder for rolling stock.

In 1991, bids were called for the supply and technology transfer of the core system technology, which in addition to the rolling stock also included the catenary and signalling of the line.  On August 26, 1991, three competitors submitted bids: consortia led by GEC-Alsthom (today Alstom, one of the builders of France's TGV trains; Siemens, one of the builders of Germany's ICE trains; and Mitsubishi, one of the builders of Japan's Shinkansen trains.

Once planning progressed, in March 1992, the Korea High Speed Rail Construction Authority (KHSRCA) was established as a separate body with own budget responsible for the project.  In the 1993 reappraisal of the project, the finishing date was pushed out to May 2002, and estimated costs grew to 10.74 trillion won.  82% of the cost increase was due to a 90% increase of unit costs in the construction sector (mostly labour costs but also material costs), the remainder due to alignment changes (longer route, more stations), though some city tunnels were dropped.  To finance the project, the option of a Build-Operate-Transfer (BOT) franchise was rejected as too risky.  Funding included direct government grants (35%), government (10%) and foreign (18%) loans, domestic bond sales (31%) and private capital (6%).

Start of construction

Construction started before the choice of the main technology supplier, thus alignment design was set out to be compatible with all choices. Of the planned  line,  would be laid on bridges, and another  in tunnels. However, plans were changed repeatedly, in particular those for city sections, following disputes with local governments.

Construction suffered from early quality problems. After an independent safety inspection in 1996, repairs were necessary on 190 locations, and even partial reconstruction was needed at another 39 locations.

Meanwhile, the bidding of the core system technology contract progressed through five rounds of evaluation, and the French and German consortia submitted final bids on June 15, 1993.  KHSRCA announced that the GEC-Alsthom-led consortium was the preferred bidder on August 20, 1993, and the contract was signed on June 14, 1994.  The consortium consisted of GEC-Alsthom and its Korean subsidiary Eukorail.

The technology was almost identical to that found on the high-speed lines of France's TGV system.

First phase: Seoul–Daegu and connected upgrades

Following the 1997 Asian Financial Crisis, the government decided to realise the Gyeongbu HSR in two phases. In a first phase,  of the high-speed line would be finished by 2004, with trains travelling along the upgraded conventional line along the rest of the planned  route. The budget for the first phase was set at 12,737.7 billion won, that for the entire project at 18,435.8 billion won in 1998 prices. While the share of government contributions remained unchanged, the share of foreign loans, domestic bond sales and private capital changed to 24%, 29% and 2%.

Well ahead of the opening of the Gyeongbu HSR for regular service, in December 1999,  of the test section was finished to enable trials with trains.

Hwanghak Tunnel became Korea's longest bored tunnel once the line opened.

The project budget also included the electrification of the short connecting section at Daejeon and the Daegu-Busan section of the existing Gyeongbu Line, as well as the entire Honam Line from Daejeon to Mokpo.

The infrastructure and rolling stock were built in the framework of a technology transfer agreement between core system supplier Alstom and local companies, with Alstom's part of the project amounting to US$2.1 billion resp. €1.5 billion.  Other foreign contributors included SNCF (training and supervision of infrastructure and operations), Pandrol and Vossloh (rail fastenings), and Cegelec (catenary).  Their domestic partners for the infrastructure parts were LG Industrial Systems and Samsung (signalling and train control); ILJIN and LG Cable (catenary).  SYSTRA and Bechtel was also involved in project management.

After 12 years of construction, service using the first phase of the Gyeongbu HSR started on April 1, 2004.

Second phase: Daegu–Busan
The Daegu–Busan section of the Gyeongbu HSR became a separate project with the July 1998 project revision, with a budget of 5,698.1 billion won, to be funded from direct government and private sources at the same ratios as for phase 1.  In August 2006, the project was modified to include the downtown passages of Daejeon and Daegu, as well as additional stations along the phase 1 section at Osong, between Cheonan and Daejeon; and Gimcheon, (between Daejeon and Daegu. Consequently, the budget was increased to 7,190.0 billion won, and the government's share of the funding was increased by 5 percentage points to 50%.

Construction started in June 2002. The  of new tracks, consisting of the  South Daegu Interconnection,  of high-speed tracks, and a  low-speed section connecting into Busan station, follow a long curve to the northeast of the existing Gyeongbu Line, with new stations for Gyeongju and Ulsan built well outside of the city centres.

The original plans foresaw a second-phase opening in 2008, with new trains cruising at a top speed of  cutting Seoul-Busan travel times to just 1 hours 56 minutes.  However, construction was delayed, and trains with higher top speeds weren't yet available.  The main cause of delay was a long dispute over the environmental impact assessment of the Wonhyo Tunnel, which passes under a wetland area.  The dispute gained nationwide and international attention due to the repeated hunger strikes of a Buddhist nun, led to a suspension of works in 2005, and only ended with a supreme court ruling in June 2006.

For the second phase of the Gyeongbu HSR, the RHEDA 2000 ballastless track system of German manufacturer RAIL.ONE was chosen. However, construction faced quality problems concerning sleepers and fastenings. Meanwhile, it was revealed that the Pandrol and Vossloh clips chosen for the rail fastenings were submitted to indoor tests only, omitting field tests, and the Pandrol clips saw no prior use on another high-speed line.

With the exception of the sections across Daejeon and Daegu, the second phase went into service on November 1, 2010.  By that time, 4,905.7 billion won was spent out of a second phase budget, or 17,643.4 billion won out of the total.

As of October 2010, the total cost of the second phase was estimated at 7,945.4 billion won, that for the entire project at 20,728.2 billion won.

Other connected high-speed lines

The Honam HSR branches from the Gyeongbu HSR at its newly built Osong station, and is meant to accelerate Honam KTX services to Mokpo. The first stage from Osong to Gwangju is in construction since December 2009, and is to be opened in 2014.

A branch from the existing Gyeongbu HSR near its northern end to Suseo-dong, a southeastern ward of Seoul, was in the original plans of the Honam HSR.  The Suseo High-Speed Railway was announced as a separate project, on a route from a junction with the Gyeongbu HSR at Pyeongtaek to Suseo, on December 30, 2009.  The goal was to complete the project by 2014.

Singyeongju station on the second phase section of the Gyeongbu HSR is to become a junction with the re-aligned Ulsan-Gyeongju-Pohang section of the Donghae Nambu Line, which is to open in 2014. On April 23, 2009, the project was approved by the government and a ground-breaking ceremony was held.  In January 2010, the early completion of the Pohang branch was confirmed by the government.

On September 1, 2010, the government released a new strategic plan, with the aim to reduce travel times for 95% of Korea to under 2 hours by 2020.  Longer-term plans under consideration included a branch from the Gyeongbu HSR to Jinju and further to the southern coast.

Stations
Six new stations were built along the Gyeongbu HSR. From Seoul to Busan:

 Gwangmyeong station, in the southwestern suburbs of Seoul
 Cheonan-Asan(Onyangoncheon) station, west of Cheonan and east of Asan
 Osong station, near Osong (opened on November 1, 2010)
 Gimcheon (Gumi) station, east of Gimcheon (opened on November 1, 2010)
 Gyeongju station, south of Gyeongju (opened with the Daegu-Busan section on November 1, 2010)
 Ulsan Station, west of Ulsan (opened with the Daegu-Busan section on November 1, 2010)

Once complete, the Gyeongbu HSR will directly connect to four existing main stations in major cities, which KTX trains currently reach on tracks of the conventional Gyeongbu Line:

 Seoul Station: plans for separate tracks until Gwangmyeong were abandoned when the project was phased in 1998
 Daejeon Station: separate tracks across downtown Daejeon in construction for 2014
 Dongdaegu Station: separate tracks across downtown Daegu in construction for 2014
 Busan: the end of the line since November 1, 2010

Operation

General
From March 2, 2010, KTX-II (KTX-Sancheon) trains began to use the line in commercial service with the same top speed.

As of 2011, all KTX services routed along the line also use sections of connected conventional mainlines.

No casualties were reported, only one passenger suffered slight injury, but KTX traffic was blocked until repairs for 29 hours. Preliminary investigation indicated that the accident resulted from a series of human errors. Because workers improperly repaired a point along the tracks. Investigators found that the derailment was caused by a switch malfunction triggered by a loose nut from track, and suspected that a repairman failed to tighten it during maintenance the previous night. The switch's detectors signalled a problem earlier, however, a second maintenance crew failed to find the loose nut and didn't properly communicate the fact to the control center, which then allowed the train on the track. The rail union criticised Korail's use of hired repairmen. there were no problems with the train according to investigation.

Gyeongbu KTX
KTX trains not deviating from the Seoul–Busan corridor are operated as the Gyeongbu KTX service.  When introduced in 2004, the new service cut travel time between Seoul and Busan from 4 hours 10 minutes to 2 hours 40 minutes. The Seoul–Busan travel distance was shortened from   The fastest services made intermediate stops only in Daejeon and Daegu, other stations were served by trains with different stopping patterns. Some Gyeongbu KTX services will continue to serve the original relation after the November 1, 2010, opening of the second phase of the Gyeongbu HSR, with travel times between 2 hours 55 minutes and 3 hours.

Korail met local demands by introducing additional KTX services between Seoul and Dongdaegu in June 2007, which left the Gyeongbu HSR between Daejeon and Dongdaegu to serve Gimcheon and Gumi on the conventional line. These services were discontinued with the opening of the Gimcheon (Gumi) station on the high-speed line.  New services introduced with the same timetable change leave the Gyeongbu HSR on the Seoul–Daejeon section to serve Suwon.

With the opening of the Daegu-Busan section on November 1, 2010, the fastest Seoul–Busan services, using all of the Gyeongbu HSR with intermediate stops in Daejeon and Dongdaegu only, reduced the shortest travel times by 22 minutes to 2 hours 18 minutes. From December 1, 2010, Korail added a pair of non-stop trains with a travel time of 2 hours 8 minutes.  With the completion of the sections across urban Daejeon and Daegu, a further improvement of the four-stop travel time to 2 hour and 10 minutes between Seoul and Busan is expected.

The frequency of Gyeongbu HSR services was 94 daily runs when the service started in April 2004.  Three and a half months later, trains running on some days of the week only were introduced, while overall frequency was reduced.  Since then, total weekly train frequency was increased with every timetable change, and fluctuates between a minimum of 120 services from Tuesdays to Thursdays to a maximum of 154 services on Saturdays in the January 17, 2011 timetable.

Evolution of long-distance passenger traffic
When the project was started, initial ridership on the Gyeongbu HSR was expected to be 200,000 passengers a day.  In the first estimate after the separation of the project into phases, the prediction for the first-year average daily ridership of the Gyeongbu KTX Line was 141,497, which reduced to 115,828 in the final August 2003 forecast. Actual first-year numbers were about a half of the last estimate, but rose significantly in the second and third year.  In October 2010, before the opening of the Daegu–Busan section, Korail expected total KTX ridership (including Honam KTX) to rise from the then current 106,000 to 135,000 passengers a day.

{| class="wikitable"
|+ Ridership/day
|-
! 2004
|align="right"| 60,717
|-
! 2005
|align="right"| 73,567
|-
! 2006
|align="right"| 82,716
|-
! 2007
|align="right"| 84,851
|-
! 2008
|align="right"| 85,685
|}

On the short distance relation between Seoul and Cheonan, due to the short distance and the location of the KTX station outside the city, KTX gained only a very modest market share, with little effect on the overall modal share of intercity rail. On the medium-distance relation from Seoul to Daejeon, KTX gained market share mostly at the expense of normal express services on the Gyeongbu Line, and helped to increase the total share of rail to a third.  On the long-distance relations from Seoul to Daegu and Busan, KTX took both the majority of the market and the bulk of rail passengers, increasing the total share of rail from around two-fifths to a market dominating two-thirds by 2008.

Gyeongbu KTX stops
The terminal for most Gyeongbu KTX services is Seoul Station, but some trains continue beyond Seoul Station for  along the Gyeongui Line to terminate at Haengsin station, a stop added due to the station's vicinity to the main KTX maintenance facility, Goyang depot.

Passenger surveys in the first months found that the limited capacity of bus connections and the lack of subway connections for intermediate stations, especially the newly built stations Gwangmyeong and Cheonan-Asan, was the problem mentioned most often.  A better connection to Cheonan-Asan station was provided by an extension of Seoul Subway Line 1 along the Janghang Line, opened on December 14, 2008.  Gwangmyeong station was linked to the same subway line by a shuttle service on December 15, 2006, but it made little impact due to the longtime differences between KTX and subway train schedules.

Other services

Services using the Gyeongbu HSR only from Seoul to Daejeon and continuing all along the Honam Line are operated as the Honam KTX service. When introduced in 2004, the new service cut travel time between Yongsan in Seoul and Mokpo from 4 hours 42 minutes to 2 hours 58 minutes.  From April 2011, the new Jeolla KTX service will use the same section of the Gyeongbu HSR to reach Yeosu along the Honam and Jeolla Lines, reducing the Seoul–Yeosu travel time from the current 5 hours 13 minutes to 2 hours 55 minutes.  The new service will  After the completion of the first stage of the Honam HSR and then the Suseo HSR, most Honam and Jeolla KTX services will use the Gyeongbu HSR only between the junction near Pyeongtaek and Osong.

Services using the Gyeongbu HSR between Seoul and Dongdaegu, and diverging to the Gyeongbu Line to reach the Gyeongjeon Line, are operated as the Gyeongjeon KTX service, which started on December 15, 2010, initially reaching Masan with a minimum travel time of 2 hours 54 minutes. This service is to be extended to Jinju by 2012.

From 2012, Korail plans to extend some KTX services to Incheon International Airport on the AREX line.  The planned travel time between Incheon International Airport and Busan is 2 hours 41 minutes.

From 2015, a KTX service between Seoul and Pohang, diverging from the Gyeongbu HSR to the Donghae Line at Singyeongju station, is planned to cut travel time by 33 minutes to 1 hour 50 minutes.

Test runs
The section from Cheonan to Daejeon, with Osong depot as operations base, was used for the commissioning of the KTX-I trains before the start of regular service. Following the start of regular service, test runs were concentrated into the night hours when no regular trains ran.

Branch Lines 
There are 8 branch lines in Gyeongbu high-speed railway line; 7 are operating and 1 is under construction.

References

See also
KTX

High-speed railway lines in Korea
Railway lines opened in 2004
2004 establishments in South Korea